Ishmael Scott Reed (born February 22, 1938) is an American poet, novelist, essayist, songwriter, composer, playwright, editor and publisher known for his satirical works challenging American political culture. Perhaps his best-known work is Mumbo Jumbo (1972), a sprawling and unorthodox novel set in 1920s New York.

Reed's work has often sought to represent neglected African and African-American perspectives; his energy and advocacy have centered more broadly on neglected peoples and perspectives, irrespective of their cultural origins.

Life and career
Reed was born in Chattanooga, Tennessee. His family moved to Buffalo, New York, when he was a child, during the Great Migration. After attending local schools, Reed attended the University at Buffalo. Reed withdrew from college in his junior year, partly for financial reasons, but mainly because he felt he needed a new atmosphere to support his writing and music. He said of this decision:

This was the best thing that could have happened to me at the time because I was able to continue experimenting along the lines I wanted, influenced by [Nathanael] West and others. I didn't want to be a slave to somebody else's reading lists. I kind of regret the decision now because I've gotten some of the most racist and horrible things said to me because of this.

In 1995, the college awarded him an honorary doctorate.

Speaking about his influences, Reed has said:

I've probably been more influenced by poets than by novelists—the Harlem Renaissance poets, the Beat poets, the American surrealist Ted Joans. Poets have to be more attuned to originality, coming up with lines and associations the ordinary prose writer wouldn't think of.

Among writers from the Harlem Renaissance for whose work Reed has expressed admiration are Langston Hughes, Zora Neale Hurston, George Schuyler, Bruce Nugent, Countee Cullen, and Arna Bontemps.

In 1962, Reed moved to New York City and co-founded with Walter Bowart the East Village Other, which became a well-known underground publication. He was also a member of the Umbra Writers Workshop, some of whose members helped establish the Black Arts Movement and promoted a Black Aesthetic. Although Reed never participated in that movement, he has continued to research the history of black Americans. While working on his novel Flight to Canada (1976), he coined the term "Neo-Slave narrative", which he used in 1984 in "A Conversation with Ishmael Reed" by Reginald Martin. During this time Reed also made connections with musicians and poets such as Sun Ra, Cecil Taylor, and Albert Ayler, which contributed to Reed's vast experimentation with jazz and his love for music.

In 1970, Reed moved to the West Coast to begin teaching at the University of California, Berkeley, where he taught for 35 years. Retired from there in 2005, he is serving as a Distinguished Professor at California College of the Arts. He lives in Oakland, California, with his wife of more than 50 years, Carla Blank, a noted author, choreographer, and director.

His late daughter, Timothy Reed, dedicated her semi-autobiographical book Showing Out (Thunder's Mouth Press, 2003) to him. His archives are held by the Special Collections at the University of Delaware in Newark. Ishmael Reed: An Exhibition, curated by Timothy D. Murray, was shown at the University of Delaware Library from August 16 to December 16, 2007.

Personal life 
In 1960, Reed married Priscilla Thompson. Their daughter, Timothy (1960–2021), was born the same year. Reed and Thompson later divorced. Since 1970, he has been married to writer and teacher Carla Blank. Their daughter, Tennessee, is also an author.

Published works
Reed's published works include 12 novels, beginning in 1967 with of The Freelance Pallbearers, followed by Yellow Back Radio Broke-Down (1969), Mumbo Jumbo (1972), The Last Days of Louisiana Red (1974), Flight to Canada (1976), The Terrible Twos (1982), Reckless Eyeballing (1986), The Terrible Threes (1989), Japanese by Spring (1993), Juice! (2011), Conjugating Hindi (2018), and most recently The Terrible Fours, third in his "Terribles" series and published by Baraka Books of Montreal in June 2021. To commemorate its 50 years in print, in 2022, Scribner's released a new edition of his third novel, Mumbo Jumbo, cited by Harold Bloom as one of 500 great books of the Western canon. It includes a new introduction by Reed.

Among his other books are seven collections of poetry, including Why the Black Hole Sings the Blues: Poems 2006–2019, released by Dalkey Archive Press in November 2020; 11 collections of essays, with the most recent, Why No Confederate Statues in Mexico, released by Baraka Books in September 2019; one farce, Cab Calloway Stands In for the Moon or The Hexorcism of Noxon D Awful (1970); two librettos, Gethsemane Park and in collaboration with Colleen McElroy The Wild Gardens of the Loop Garoo; a sampler collection, The Reed Reader (2000); two travelogues, of which the most recent is Blues City: A Walk in Oakland (2003); and six plays, collected by Dalkey Archive Press as Ishmael Reed, The Plays (2009). His seventh play, The Final Version, premiered at New York City's Nuyorican Poets Café in December 2013; his eighth, Life Among the Aryans ("a satire that chronicles the misadventures of two hapless revolutionaries"), had a staged reading in 2017 at the Nuyorican Poets Café and a full production in 2018. Reed's ninth play, The Haunting of Lin-Manuel Miranda, premiered on May 23, 2019, at the Nuyorican Poets Café. Archway Editions, an imprint of powerHouse Cultural Entertainment, published the script in October 2020. His tenth play, The Slave Who Loved Caviar, received a virtual reading premiere in March 2021, and a full production premiered at the Off-Broadway venue Theater for the New City on December 23, 2021. His most recent nonfiction works are Malcolm and Me, an audiobook narrated by Reed and released by Audible in 2020, and The Complete Muhammad Ali, published by Baraka Books of Montreal in 2015. Audible released a new short story by Reed, "The Fool Who Thought Too Much", in November 2020. In 2022, Audible released Reed's new novella, "The Man Who Haunted Himself".

Reed has also edited 15 anthologies, the most recent being Bigotry on Broadway, co-edited with his wife, Carla Blank, and published by Baraka Books of Montreal in September, 2021. Other anthologies include Black Hollywood Unchained (Third World Press, 2015) and POW WOW, Charting the Fault Lines in the American Experience—Short Fiction from Then to Now (2009), a collection of works by 63 writers, co-edited with Carla Blank, which spans more than 200 years of American writing. In his foreword Reed calls it "a gathering of voices from the different American tribes." POW WOW is the fiction companion anthology to From Totems to Hip-Hop: A Multicultural Anthology of Poetry Across the Americas, 1900–2002 (2003), in which Reed endorses an open definition of American poetry as an amalgamation, which should include work found in the traditional Western canon of European-influenced American poetry as well as work by immigrants, hip-hop artists, and Native Americans.

The 2013 Signet Classic edition of Mark Twain's The Adventures of Tom Sawyer and Adventures of Huckleberry Finn features a new afterword by Reed. In 2019, he contributed forewords to The Collected Novels of Charles Wright, published by Harper Perennial; Charles Fréger's Cimarron: Freedom and Masquerade (Thames & Hudson); and Cathy Jackson-Gent's Surviving Financially in a Rigged System (Third World Press Foundation). His Introduction to The Minister Primarily, a previously unpublished novel by the late John Oliver Killens, was published by Amistad in July 2021.

Honors and awards
Two of Reed's books have been nominated for National Book Awards, both in 1973: his poetry collection Conjure, and his 1972 novel Mumbo Jumbo. Conjure was also nominated for a Pulitzer Prize. His New and Collected Poems, 1964–2007, received the Commonwealth Club of California's gold medal. A poem published in Seattle in 1969, "beware : do not read this poem", has been cited by Gale Research Company as one of approximately 20 poems that teachers and librarians have ranked as the most frequently studied in literature courses. Reed's novels, poetry and essays have been translated into French, Spanish, Italian, German, Japanese, Hebrew, Hungarian, Dutch, Korean, Chinese and Czech, among other languages.

The University of California at Berkeley honored Reed as their Distinguished Emeritus Awardee of the Year 2020. In June 2018, in Detroit, Reed was honored with the Charles H. Wright Museum of African American History Award. On November 20, 2017, Reed received the AUDELCO Pioneer Award for the Theater. Between 2012 and 2016, Reed served as the first SF Jazz Poet Laureate from SF JAZZ, the leading non-profit jazz organization on the West Coast. An installation of his poem "When I Die I Will Go to Jazz" appears on the SFJAZZ Center's North Gate in Linden Alley. In Venice, Italy, in May 2016, he became the first recipient of a new international prize, the Alberto Dubito International, for an individual who has distinguished himself or herself through innovative creativity in musical and linguistic expression. His poem, "Just Rollin' Along," about the 1934 encounter between Bonnie and Clyde and Oakland Blues artist L. C. Good Rockin' Robinson, is included in The Best American Poetry 2019.

Among Reed's other honors are writing fellowships from the Guggenheim Foundation and National Endowment for the Arts. In 1995, he received the Langston Hughes Medal, awarded by City College of New York. In 1997, he received the Lila Wallace Reader's Digest Award, and established a three-year collaboration between the non-profit and Oakland-based Second Start Literacy Project in 1998.

In 1998, Reed also received a John D. and Catherine T. MacArthur Foundation Fellowship award (known as a "genius" grant). In 1999, he received a Fred Cody Award from the Bay Area Book Reviewers Association, and was inducted into Chicago State University's National Literary Hall of Fame of Writers of African Descent. Other awards include an Otto René Castillo Award for Political Theatre (2002); a Phillis Wheatley Award from the Harlem Book Fair (2003); and in 2004, a Robert Kirsch Award, a Los Angeles Times Book Prize, besides the D.C. Area Writing Project's 2nd Annual Exemplary Writer's Award and the Martin Millennial Writers, Inc. Contribution to Southern Arts Award, in Memphis, Tennessee.

A 1972 manifesto inspired a major visual art exhibit, NeoHooDoo: Art for a Forgotten Faith, curated by Franklin Sirmans for the Menil Collection in Houston, Texas, where it opened on June 27, 2008, and subsequently traveled to P.S. 1 Contemporary Art Center in New York City, and the Miami Art Museum through 2009. Litquake, the annual San Francisco literary festival, honored him with its 2011 Barbary Coast Award. Buffalo, New York, celebrated February 21, 2014, as Ishmael Reed Day, when he received Just Buffalo Literary Center's 2014 Literary Legacy Award.

In April 2022, Reed was announced as the recipient of a lifetime achievement Anisfield-Wolf Book Award in recognition of his contributions to literature.

Collaborations and influences
Honoring his experience of first achieving national publication of his poetry in anthologies edited by the senior writers Langston Hughes and Walter Lowenfels, as a result of his introducing Lucille Clifton's poetry to Langston Hughes, Reed was responsible for her first national recognition in Hughes' anthology The Poetry of the Negro (1967).

Reed has continued to champion the work of other contemporary writers, by founding and serving as editor and publisher of various small presses and journals since the early 1970s. These include Yardbird Reader (which he edited from 1972 to 1976), and Reed, Cannon and Johnson Communications, an independent publishing house begun with Steve Cannon and Joe Johnson that focused on multicultural literature in the 1970s. Reed's current publishing imprint is Ishmael Reed Publishing Company, and his online literary publication, Konch Magazine, features an international mix of poetry, essays and fiction.

Among the writers first published by Reed when they were students in his writing workshops are Terry McMillan, Mona Simpson, Mitch Berman, Kathryn Trueblood, Danny Romero, Fae Myenne Ng, Brynn Saito, Mandy Kahn, and John Keene.

Reed is one of the producers of The Domestic Crusaders, a two-act play about Muslim Pakistani Americans written by his former student, Wajahat Ali. Its first act was performed at the Kennedy Center's Millennium Hall in Washington, D.C., on November 14, 2010, and remains archived on their website.

Critics have also pointed to Reed's influence on writers Percival Everett,  Colson Whitehead, Victor LaValle and Paul Beatty. In Chris Jackson's interview of Reed in the Fall 2016 edition of The Paris Review, Reed discusses many literary influences, including Dante, the Celtic Revival poets, James Baldwin, George Schuyler, Nathanael West, Bob Kaufman, and Charles Wright. Reed said in a 2011 interview with Parul Sehgal: "My work holds up the mirror to hypocrisy, which puts me in a tradition of American writing that reaches back to Nathaniel Hawthorne." Reed has also been quoted as saying: "So this is what we want: to sabotage history. They won't know whether we're serious or whether we are writing fiction ... Always keep them guessing."

When discussing influences on his writing style in Writin’ is Fightin’ he attributed much of it to the warrior tradition he feels is inherent in African and African-American culture. Similar contemporary authors that Reed insists deny victim literature with a centralized black male villain are Amiri Baraka and Ed Bullins.

Looking forward in his writing Reed has stated that he wants to sustain Western values but mix them up a little bit to express a sense of multi-culturalism that represents more than just the African-American voice. Published in 1993 the novel, Japanese by Spring, was Reed's first trilingual text. The novel used English, Japanese, and Yoruba to better represent his ideas of a more realistic American multi-culturalism.

Conjugating Hindi, was deeply compelled by his ideas of depicting a unification of multiple cultures. In this novel Reed explores the congruencies and differences of African-American and South Asian American cultures though political discourse posed by white neo-conservative Americans toward both ethnicities. As described in the Los Angeles Review of Books, "it is brilliant — the same sort of experimental brilliance observable in the fiction of Thomas Pynchon or the cut-up technique of William S. Burroughs — and more accessible. ...Conjugating Hindi is a firebrand’s novel, the crackling, overflowing, pugnacious novel of someone who doesn't care about genre boundaries any more than he cares about historical boundaries, but who does care deeply about innovating."

Music
Ishmael Reed's texts and lyrics have been performed, composed or set to music by Albert Ayler, David Murray, Allen Toussaint, Carman Moore, Taj Mahal, Olu Dara, Lester Bowie, Carla Bley, Steve Swallow, Ravi Coltrane, Leo Nocentelli, Eddie Harris, Anthony Cox, Don Pullen, Billy Bang, Bobby Womack, Milton Cardona, Omar Sosa, Fernando Saunders, Yosvanni Terry, Jack Bruce, Little Jimmy Scott, Robert Jason, Alvin Youngblood Hart, Mary Wilson of the Supremes, Cassandra Wilson, Gregory Porter and others.

Reed has been the central participant in the longest ongoing music/poetry collaboration, known as Conjure projects, produced by Kip Hanrahan on American Clavé: Conjure I (1984) and Conjure II (1988), which were reissued by Rounder Records in 1995; and Conjure Bad Mouth (2005), whose compositions were developed in live Conjure band performances, from 2003 to 2004, including engagements at Paris's Banlieues Bleues, London's Barbican Centre, and the Blue Note Café in Tokyo. The Village Voice ranked the 2005 Conjure CD one of four best spoken-word albums released in 2006.

In 2007, Reed made his debut as a jazz pianist and bandleader with For All We Know by The Ishmael Reed Quintet. His piano playing was cited by Harper's Bazaar and Vogue as he accompanied a 2019 fashion show at the Serpentine Gallery in London, featuring the work of designer Grace Wales Bonner. In 2008, he was honored as Blues Songwriter of the Year from the West Coast Blues Hall of Fame Awards. A David Murray CD released in 2009, The Devil Tried to Kill Me, includes two songs with lyrics by Reed: "Afrika", sung by Taj Mahal, and the title song performed by SF-based rapper Sista Kee. On September 11, 2011, in a Jazz à la Villette concert at the Grande Halle in Paris, the Red Bull Music Academy World Tour premiered three new songs with lyrics by Ishmael Reed, performed by Macy Gray, Tony Allen, members of The Roots, David Murray and his Big Band, Amp Fiddler and Fela! singer/dancers. In 2013, David Murray, with vocalists Macy Gray and Gregory Porter, released the CD Be My Monster Love, with three new songs with lyrics by Reed: "Army of the Faithful", "Hope is a Thing With Feathers," and the title track, "Be My Monster Love." In 2022, Reed released his first album of original compositions, The Hands Of Grace.

Before Columbus Foundation
Ishmael Reed is the founder of the Before Columbus Foundation, which since 1980 has annually presented the American Book Awards and the Oakland chapter of PEN, known as the "blue-collar PEN", which also gives annual awards to writers.

Bibliography

Novels and short fiction
 The Freelance Pallbearers, 1967
 Yellow Back Radio Broke-Down, 1969
 Mumbo Jumbo, 1972
 The Last Days of Louisiana Red, 1974
 Flight to Canada, 1976
 The Terrible Twos, 1982
 Reckless Eyeballing, 1986
 The Terrible Threes, 1989
 Japanese by Spring, 1993
 Juice!, 2011
 Conjugating Hindi, 2018
 "The Fool Who Thought Too Much" (short story), 2020
 The Terrible Fours, 2021
 The Man Who Haunted Himself, 2022

Poetry and other collected works
 catechism of d neoamerican hoodoo church, 1969
 Cab Calloway Stands in for the Moon or D Hexorcism of Noxon D Awful, 1970
 Neo-HooDoo Manifesto, 1972
 Conjure: Selected Poems, 1963–1970, 1972
 Chattanooga: Poems, 1973
 A Secretary to the Spirits, illustrated by Betye Saar, 1978
 New and Collected Poetry, 1988
 The Reed Reader, 2000
 New and Collected Poems, 1964–2006, 2006 (hardcover); New and Collected Poems, 1964-2007, 2007 (paperback)
 Why the Black Hole Sings the Blues, 2020

Plays and librettos
 The Wild Gardens of the Loup Garou, with poetry by Reed and Colleen McElroy and music by Carman Moore (1981, 1989)
 Gethsemane Park, libretto; Carman Moore, composer (premiere, Berkeley Black Repertory Theater, 1998)
 Ishmael Reed, THE PLAYS, a collection of six plays published by Dalkey Archive Press (2009), as listed with date of premiere: Mother Hubbard (1979 and revised in 1997 into a musical version); Savage Wilds (1988 Part I; 1990, Part II); Hubba City (1989, 1994); The Preacher and the Rapper (1995); C Above C Above High C (1997); Body Parts (2007), a play developed from a work first performed as Tough Love (2004)
 The Final Version, premiered at the Nuyorican Poets Café in December 2013. Forthcoming from Archway Editions, 2024
 Life Among the Aryans, premiered in full production at the Nuyorican Poets Café in June 2018. Archway Editions, 2022
 The Haunting of Lin-Manuel Miranda, premiered in full production at the Nuyorican Poets Café in May 2019, published by Archway Editions in 2020
 The Slave Who Loved Caviar, premiered in a virtual reading sponsored by the Nuyorican Poets Café in March 2021; a full production premiered December 23, 2021 at Theater for the New City. Forthcoming from Archway Editions, 2023.
 The Conductor, a full production will premiere at Theater for the New City, opening March 9 and closing March 26, 2023.

Non-fiction
 Shrovetide in Old New Orleans: Essays, Atheneum, 1978
 God Made Alaska for the Indians: Selected Essays, Garland, 1982
  Writin' Is Fightin': Thirty-seven Years of Boxing On Paper.  New York: Atheneum, 1989
 Airing Dirty Laundry.  New York: Addison-Wesley, 1993
 Oakland Rhapsody, The Secret Soul Of An American Downtown. Introduction and Commentary by Ishmael Reed and photographs by Richard Nagler. North Atlantic Books, 1995 
 Blues City: A Walk in Oakland, Crown Journeys, 2003
 Another Day at the Front: Dispatches from the Race War, Basic Books, 2003
 Mixing It Up: Taking on the Media Bullies and Other Reflections, Da Capo Press, 2008
 Barack Obama and the Jim Crow Media: The Return of the "Nigger Breakers", Baraka Books, 2010
 Going Too Far: Essays About America's Nervous Breakdown, Baraka Books, 2012
 The Complete Muhammad Ali, Baraka Books, July 2015
 "Jazz Musicians as Pioneer Multi-Culturalists, the Co-Optation of Them, and the Reason Jazz Survives" in American Multiculturalism in Context, Views from at Home and Abroad edited by Sami Ludwig, Cambridge Scholars Publishing, 2017, pp. 189–199
 Why No Confederate Statues in Mexico, a collection of new and collected essays, Baraka Books, 2019
 Malcolm and Me, written and narrated by Reed, Audible, 2020

Anthologies edited by Reed
 19 Necromancers From Now, Doubleday & Co., 1970
 Calafia: The California Poetry, Yardbird Pub. Co., 1978, 
 Yardbird Lives!, co-edited with Al Young, Grove Press, 1978, 
  QUILT #1, Ishmael Reed & Al Young, 1981. 
 QUILT #2, A special issue devoted to the stories of students at University of California Berkeley. Ishmael Reed & Al Young, 1981. 
 The Before Columbus Foundation Fiction Anthology, Selections from the American Book Awards 1980–1990, co-edited with Kathryn Trueblood and Shawn Wong, W. W. Norton, 1991, 
 The HarperCollins Literary Mosaic Series, General Editor of four anthologies edited by Gerald Vizenor, Shawn Wong, Nicolas Kanellos and Al Young, 1995–96
 MultiAmerica: Essays on Cultural Wars and Cultural Peace, Viking/Penguin, 1997, 
 From Totems to Hip-Hop: A Multicultural Anthology of Poetry Across the Americas, 1900–2001, Da Capo Press, 2003, 
 Pow Wow: 63 Writers Address the Fault Lines in the American Experience, short fiction anthology edited with Carla Blank, Da Capo Press, 2009, 
 Black Hollywood Unchained, non-fiction anthology edited and with an Introduction by Reed, Third World Press, October 2015, 
 Bigotry on Broadway, co-edited with Carla Blank, with an Introduction by Reed, Baraka Books, September 2021

Discography
Kip Hanrahan has released three albums featuring lyrics by Reed:
Conjure: Music for the Texts of Ishmael Reed (American Clave, 1985)
Conjure: Cab Calloway Stands in for the Moon (American Clave, 1985)
Conjure: Bad Mouth (American Clave, 2005)

David Murray has released several albums featuring lyrics by Reed:
 Sacred Ground (Justin Time, 2007) – "Sacred Ground" and "The Prophet of Doom" sung by Cassandra Wilson
 The Devil Tried to Kill Me (Justin Time, 2009) – "The Devil Tried to Kill Me" sung by Sista Kee and "Africa" sung by Taj Mahal
Be My Monster Love (Motéma, 2013) – "Be My Monster Love" sung by Macy Gray and "Army of the Faithful (Joyful Noise)" and "Hope Is a Thing with Feathers" sung by Gregory Porter
 blues for memo (Doublemoon Records, 2016) - "Red Summer" sung by Pervis Evans
Yosvany Terry has released one album including lyrics by Reed:
 New Throned Kings (SPassion 2014), CD nominated for a 2014 Grammy Award, with Ishmael Reed's lyrics on "Mase Nadodo."

Releases produced by Ishmael Reed
 His Bassist (Konch Records, Ishmael Reed, producer), featuring Ortiz Walton and including collaborations based on Reed's poetry, 2014
 For All We Know (Ishmael Reed Publishing, 2007) with the Ishmael Reed quintet, features David Murray (sax, bass clarinet and piano), and Carla Blank (violin), Roger Glenn (flute), Chris Planas (guitar), and Ishmael Reed (piano) on nine jazz standards, and three original collaborations with text by Reed and music composed by David Murray, were first performed by Ishmael Reed on this privately produced CD.  David Murray then wrote different compositions for these Reed lyrics for the film and CD Sacred Ground.
 The Hands Of Grace (Reading Group, 2022)

Selected public art installations, film and video collaborations 
 2021: Bad Attitude: The Art of Spain Rodriguez, a documentary film written and directed by Susan Stern.
 2018: I Am Richard Pryor, a documentary directed by Jesse James Miller and produced by Jennifer Lee Pryor for Paramount Network.
 2018: Personal Problems (1980), the experimental soap opera conceived and produced by Reed and directed by Bill Gunn, was re-mastered and featured in The Groundbreaking Bill Gunn at BAM Cinematek in 2010 and in 2018, was carefully restored by Kino Lorber and is now available in DVD and Blue-Ray.
 2017: LIT CITY banner along Washington Street in Buffalo, New York, as part of a celebration of the city's literary history.
 2013: SF JAZZ Center, which opened in January 2013, installs Reed's poem "When I Die I Will Go to Jazz" on the center's North Gate in Linden Alley.
 2013: Richard Pryor: Omit the Logic, a documentary film directed by Marina Zenovich. Winner of an Image Award for Outstanding Documentary, TV.
 2010–13: A collaborative public art installation work, Moving Richmond, for Richmond, California's BART station, incorporates two Reed poems, written for this project after meetings with Richmond residents, into two mounted iron sculptures by Mildred Howard.
 2012: United States of HooDoo, a documentary film by Oliver Hardt and Darius James, was released in Germany and premiered in August at the Black Star Film Festival in Philadelphia. Reed is a featured participant.
 2011: "beware do not read this poem". Included in stone installation and audio recording by Rochester Poets Walk, Rochester, New York.
 2008: Boogie Man: The Lee Atwater Story, directed by Stefan Forbes, premiered as a nationally distributed independent film that includes Reed in interview clips. 
 2004: A bronze plaque of Reed's poem "Going East", installed in the Berkeley Poetry Walk in Berkeley, California, designated a National Poetry Landmark by the Academy of American Poets
 1990: James Baldwin: The Price of the Ticket. Independent film directed by Karin Thorsen, includes Reed in interview clips and reading from Baldwin's work. 
 1972: "from the files of agent 22", Reed's poem, was posted in New York City buses and subways, by Poetry in Public Places, during an American International Sculptors Symposium project.

Further reading
 Lucas, Julian. "The Yeehaw Papyrus," The New York Review of Books, May 15, 2022.
 Lucas, Julian. "Ishmael Reed Gets The Last Laugh", The New Yorker, online July 18, 2021.
 Gilyard, Keith. "Review of Ishmael Reed's 'Conjugating Hindi'." Tribes Magazine, July 9, 2018.
 Howell, Patrick A. "Ishmael Reed in Interview", Into the Void magazine, April 14, 2018.
 Wang, Liya. Ishmael Reed and Multiculturalism. Beijing: Foreign Language Teaching and Research Press, 2018.
 Zeng, Yanyu. "Interview with Ishmael Reed."  Journal of Foreign Languages and Cultures, Hunan Normal University, Volume 1/No.1/December 2017.
 Ludwig, Sami (ed.) American Multiculturalism in Context: Views from at Home and Abroad. Newcastle upon Tyne, UK: Cambridge Scholars Publishing, 2017. Includes "Jazz Musicians as Pioneer Multi-Culturalists, the Co-Optation of Them, and the Reason Jazz Survives" by Ishmael Reed, pp. 189–199.
 Paladin, Nicola, and Giogio Rimondi (eds). Una bussola per l'infosfera, con Ishmael Reed tra musica e letteratura. Milano: Agenzia X, 2017. Includes Reed's address, "Da Willert Park Courts a Palazzo Leoni Montanari," pp. 27–39.
 Rimondi, Giorgio (ed.). Il grande incantatore per Ishmael Reed. Milan, Italy: Agenzia X, 2016. (Includes essays on Reed's work by Italian scholars and translations of 10 Reed poems.)
 Lin, Yuqing. A Study on Ishmael Reed's Neo-HooDoo Multiculturalism. Beijing: Intellectual Property Publishing House, 2015. 《伊什梅尔•里德的"新伏都"多元文化主义研究》，北京：知识产权出版社，2015. 
 Lin, Yuqing. "The Writing Politics of Multicultural Literature--An Interview with Ishmael Reed" New Perspectives on World Literature, 2016(1) 《多元文化主义的写作政治——伊什梅尔·里德访谈录》，《外国文学动态研究》
 Lin, Yuqing. "Fight Media Hegemony with a Trickster's Critique: Ishmael Reed's Faction about O.J. and Media Lynching".  The Project on the History of Black Writing, September 10, 2014: 
 Wang, Liya. "Postcolonial Narrative Studies", Foreign Literature Study, no. 4, 2014. 《"后殖民叙事学"》，《外国文学》，2014年第4期。
 Ludwig, Sami (ed.). On the Aesthetic Legacy of Ishmael Reed: Contemporary Assessments. Huntington Beach, California: World Parade Books, 2012.
 Wang, Liya.  "Irony and Allegory in Ishmael Reed's Japanese by Spring." Foreign Literature Studies, No. 4. 2010. 论伊什梅尔·里德《春季日语班》中的反讽隐喻， 《外国文学》 2010年第4期。
 Wang, Liya. "History and Allegory in Ishmael Reed's Fiction." Foreign Literature  Review, no. 4, 2010. 伊什梅尔·里德的历史叙述及其政治隐喻，外国文学评论，2010年第4期。
 Zeng, Yanyu. "Identity Crisis and the Irony of Political Correctness in Ishmael Reed's Japanese by Spring and Philip Roth's The Human Stain", Contemporary Foreign Literature, No. 2, pp. 79–87, 2012.
Zeng, Yanyu. "Neo Hoodooism and Historiography in Ishmael Reed's Flight to Canada", Contemporary Foreign Literature, No. 4, pp. 92–99, 2010.
 Sirmans, Franklin (ed.). NeoHooDoo, Art for a Forgotten Faith. New Haven and London: The Menil Foundation, Inc., distributed by Yale University Press, 2008. (Includes Sirmans' interview with Reed, pp. 74–81.)
 Lin, YuanFu. On Ishmael Reed's Postmodernist Fictional Art of Parody. Xiamen, China: Xiamen University Press, 2008.
 Mvuyekure, Pierre-Damien, with a preface by Jerome Klinkowitz. The "Dark Heathenism" of the American Novelist Ishmael Reed: African Voodoo as American Literary Hoodoo. Lewiston, NY: The Edwin Mellen Press Ltd, 2007.
 Ross, Kent Chapin. Towards Postmodern Multiculturalism: A New Trend of African American and Jewish American Literature Viewed Through Ishmael Reed and Philip Roth, Purdue University: Philip Roth Studies, Vol. 3, No. 1, Spring 2007, pp. 70–73.
 Williams, Dana A. (ed.), African American Humor, Irony and Satire: Ishmael Reed, Satirically Speaking. Newcastle, UK: Cambridge Scholars, 2007.
 Ebbeson, Jeffrey, Postmodernism and its Others: the fiction of Ishmael Reed, Kathy Acker and Don DeLillo. London and New York: Routledge, 2006.
 Nishikawa, Kinohi. "Mumbo Jumbo", in Emmanuel S. Nelson (ed.), The Greenwood Encyclopedia of Multiethnic American Literature.  5 vols. Westport, CT: Greenwood Press, 2005. pp. 1552–53.
 Reed, Ishmael. "My 1960s" in Rediscovering America, the Making of Multicultural America, 1900–2000, written and edited by Carla Blank. Three Rivers Press, 2003, pp. 259–265. 
 Spaulding, A. Timothy. History, the Fantastic, and the Postmodern Slave Narrative. Chapter 1: "The Conflation of Time in Ishmael Reed's Flight To Canada and Octavia Butler's Kindred". Columbia: The Ohio State University Press, 2005, pp. 25–60.
 Hume, Kathryn. American Dream, American Nightmare: Fiction Since 1960. Urbana and Chicago: University of Illinois Press, 2000.
 Dick, Bruce Allen (ed. with the assistance of Pavel Zemliansky). The Critical Response to Ishmael Reed. Westport, Connecticut: Greenwood Press, 1999. (Includes Dick's 1997 telephone interview with Reed, pp. 228–250.)
 McGee, Patrick. Ishmael Reed and the Ends of Race. New York: St. Martin's Press, 1997.
 Ludwig, Sämi, Concrete Language: Intercultural Communication in Maxine Hong Kingston's The Woman Warrior and Ishmael Reed's Mumbo Jumbo. Frankfurt am Main: Peter Lang, Cross Cultural Communication Vol. 2, 1996; reissued in 2015.
 Dick, Bruce, and Amritjit Singh (eds). Conversations With Ishmael Reed, Jackson: University Press of Mississippi, 1995.
 Joyce, Joyce A. "Falling Through the Minefield of Black Feminist Criticism: Ishmael Reed, A Case in Point," Warriors, Conjurers and Priests: Defining African-centered Literary Criticism. Chicago: Third World Press, 1994.
 Nazareth, Peter. In the Trickster Tradition: The Novels of Andrew Salkey, Francis Ebejer and Ishmael Reed. London: Bogle-L'Ouverture Press, 1994.
 Weixlmann, Joe. "African American Deconstruction of the Novel in the Work of Ishmael Reed and Clarence Major": MELUS 17 (Winter 1991): 57–79.
 Spillers, Hortense J. "Changing the Letter: The Yokes, the Jokes of Discourse, or, Mrs. Stowe, Mr. Reed" in Deborah E. McDowell and Arnold Rampersad (eds), Slavery and the Literary Imagination. Baltimore and London: The Johns Hopkins University Press, 1989, pp. 25–61.
 Gates, Henry Louis, Jr. The Signifying Monkey: A Theory of Afro-American Literary Criticism, Oxford and New York: Oxford University Press, 1988.
 Martin, Reginald. Ishmael Reed and the New Black Aesthetic Critics. New York: St. Martin's Press, 1988.
 Nazareth, Peter. "Heading Them Off at the Pass: The Fiction of Ishmael Reed", The Review of Contemporary Fiction 4, no. 2, 1984.
 O'Brien, John (ed.), The Review of Contemporary Fiction, Vol. 4, No. 2, Summer, 1984. "Juan Goytisolo and Ishmael Reed Number". (Includes articles and interviews with Reed by Reginald Martin, Franco La Polla, Jerry H. Bryant, W. C. Bamberger, Joe Weixlmann, Peter Nazareth, James R. Lindroth, Geoffrey Green and Jack Byrne.)
 Fabre, Michel. "Postmodernist Rhetoric in Ishmael Reed's Yellow Back Radio Broke Down". In Peter Bruck and Wolfgang Karrer (eds), The Afro-American Novel Since 1960, Amsterdam: B.R. Gruner Publishing Co., 1982, pp. 167–88.
 Settle, Elizabeth A., and Thomas A. Settle. Ishmael Reed, a primary and secondary bibliography. Boston: G.K. Hall & Co., 1982.
 McConnell, Frank. "Da Hoodoo is Put on America", in A. Robert Lee (ed.), Black Fiction, New Studies in the Afro-American Novel Since 1945. NY: Barnes & Noble Books, 1980.
 Weixlmann, Joe, Robert Fikes, Jr., and Ishmael Reed. "Mapping out the Gumbo Works: An Ishmael Reed Bibliography", Black American Literature Forum, Vol. 12, No. 1 (Spring 1978), pp. 24–29. JSTOR, https://doi.org/10.2307/3041493.

See also

References

External links

Ishmael Reed Publications

In Depth interview with Reed, April 3, 2011
 Jonathan McAloon, "Mumbo Jumbo: a dazzling classic finally gets the recognition it deserves", The Guardian (London), August 1, 2017.
 "Ishmael Reed" at African American Literature Book Club (AALBC).

1938 births
20th-century African-American writers
20th-century American essayists
20th-century American male writers
20th-century American novelists
20th-century American poets
21st-century African-American writers
21st-century American essayists
21st-century American male writers
21st-century American novelists
21st-century American poets
African-American novelists
African-American poets
African-American publishers (people)
African-American songwriters
Afrofuturist writers
American Book Award winners
American editors
American lyricists
American male essayists
American male novelists
American male poets
American publishers (people)
American satirists
American science fiction writers
Anthologists
California College of the Arts faculty
Comedians from New York (state)
Journalists from New York (state)
Living people
MacArthur Fellows
Novelists from New York (state)
Novelists from Tennessee
People from Chattanooga, Tennessee
Postmodern writers
Songwriters from California
Songwriters from New York (state)
Songwriters from Tennessee
University at Buffalo alumni
University of California, Berkeley faculty
Writers from Buffalo, New York
Writers from Oakland, California